The 22nd Moscow International Film Festival was held from 19 to 29 July 2000. The Golden St. George was awarded to the Polish-French film Life as a Fatal Sexually Transmitted Disease directed by Krzysztof Zanussi.

Jury
 Theodoros Angelopoulos (Greece – President of the Jury)
 Caroline Ducey (France)
 Irvin Kershner (United States)
 Samira Makhmalbaf (Iran)
 Jiro Shindo (Japan)
 Sergei Solovyov (Russia)
 Bakhtyar Khudojnazarov (Tajikistan)
 Zhang Yuan (China)

Films in competition
The following films were selected for the main competition:

Awards
 Golden St. George: Life as a Fatal Sexually Transmitted Disease by Krzysztof Zanussi
 Special Silver St. George: The Garden Was Full of Moon by Vitali Melnikov
 Silver St. George:
 Best Director: Steve Suissa for Taking Wing
 Best Actor: Clément Sibony for Taking Wing
 Best Actress: Maria Simon for Angry Kisses
 Prix FIPRESCI: Lunar Eclipse by Wang Quan'an
 Special Mention: Taking Wing by Steve Suissa
 Honorable Prize: For the contribution to cinema: Gleb Panfilov

References

External links
Moscow International Film Festival: 2000 at Internet Movie Database

2000
2000 film festivals
2000 festivals in Europe
Moscow
Film
July 2000 events in Russia